Ruby Lee Mill Site is located in the Hexie Mountains, in the Mojave Desert. The site is within Joshua Tree National Park, in Riverside County, California.

The Ruby Lee Mill was established in 1935. A stamp mill is used to crush ore in order to extract minerals. This mill was probably used to extract gold and silver. 

There are a number of mines in the vicinity. Water is needed in the milling process, and there is a nearby well, which is now dry. The milling machine is no longer present, but sat on a concrete foundation.

References

Joshua Tree National Park
History of the Mojave Desert region
History of Riverside County, California
Mining in California
Stamp mills